Fu Shou (died 8 January 215) was an empress of the Eastern Han dynasty of China. She was the first wife of Emperor Xian, the last Han emperor. She is best known for initiating a conspiracy against Cao Cao, the ruler of state of Cao Wei.

Family background and marriage to Emperor Xian 
Fu Shou's father was Fu Wan, a seventh generation descendant of the early Eastern Han official Fu Zhan and the hereditary Marquis of Buqi. Fu Wan's wife was Princess Yang'an, a daughter of Emperor Huan), but she was not Fu Shou's biological mother as Fu Shou's mother was named Ying. Fu Wan also had a wife with the family name Fan, but it is not clear whether she was Ying. The Fu family descended from the prominent Confucian scholar Fu Sheng.

In 190, as Emperor Xian was being forced by Dong Zhuo to move the capital west to Chang'an, Lady Fu became an imperial consort. On 20 May 195, while Emperor Xian was largely under the control of Dong Zhuo's subordinates Li Jue and Guo Si, he designated Fu Shou as his empress consort.

As empress 
As Emperor Xian continued his reign of being constantly under the control of one warlord or another, he and Empress Fu were apparently in a loving relationship, but both saw their power increasingly becoming minimal. Later in 195, during Emperor Xian's flight back to the old capital Luoyang, Empress Fu was carrying silk, which were seized by soldiers ostensibly protecting her – such that even her own personal bodyguards were killed, and their blood spilled on her. When they returned to Luoyang, the imperial court was poorly supplied and while there is no record indicating that Empress Fu personally was under threat of starvation, a number of imperial officials died of hunger or were killed by robbers. Materially, the imperial court became much better supplied once the warlord Cao Cao arrived in 196 and took Emperor Xian and the imperial court under control. Cao Cao relocated the imperial capital to his headquarters in Xu County (present-day Xuchang, Henan).

Empress Fu was apparently not happy about Cao Cao's domination over the imperial court and central government. In February 200, Emperor Xian's concubine, Consort Dong, was forcibly executed by Cao Cao against the emperor's wishes after her father Dong Cheng was found guilty of masterminding a conspiracy to assassinate Cao Cao. After Consort Dong's death, Empress Fu became angry and fearful, so she wrote her father Fu Wan a letter accusing Cao Cao of cruelty and implicitly asking him to come up with a plan to eliminate Cao Cao. Fu Wan was fearful and did not act on the letter, but Empress Fu's letter was discovered in late 214. Cao Cao was so angry that he forced Emperor Xian to depose Empress Fu. When Emperor Xian was reluctant to do so, Cao Cao sent Hua Xin and close aides into the imperial palace to capture the empress. Empress Fu tried to hide behind a wall, but Cao Cao's men found her and dragged her out. As she was being taken away, she cried out to Emperor Xian to save her, but his only response was that he had no idea what would happen to him. She was incarcerated and killed along with her two sons (Liu Feng had predeceased his mother on 9 August 200) and more than 100 members of the Fu clan, with her mother Lady Ying and 18 others exiled.

See also 
 Lists of people of the Three Kingdoms

References

Citations

Bibliography
 Chen Shou (3rd century). Records of the Three Kingdoms (Sanguozhi).
 Fan Ye (5th century). Book of the Later Han (Houhanshu).
 Pei Songzhi (5th century). Annotations to Records of the Three Kingdoms (Sanguozhi zhu).

2nd-century births
214 deaths
Han dynasty empresses
Imperials during the end of the Han dynasty
2nd-century Chinese women
2nd-century Chinese people
3rd-century Chinese women
3rd-century Chinese people
Murdered royalty
Executed Han dynasty people
People executed by the Han dynasty
3rd-century executions
People from Zhucheng